Abbasabad-e Pamzar (also Romanized as ‘Abbāsābād-e Pāmzār; also known as ‘Abbāsābād and Khātūnābād) is a village in Kuh Panj Rural District, in the Central District of Bardsir County, Kerman Province, Iran. At the 2006 census, its population was 36, in 9 families.

References 

Populated places in Bardsir County